Polygonanthus is a small genus of flowering plants in the family Anisophylleaceae, found in the Amazon. It has a Polygonumtype embryo sac.

Species
Currently accepted species include:

Polygonanthus amazonicus Ducke
Polygonanthus punctulatus Kuhlm.

References

Anisophylleaceae
Trees of the Amazon
Cucurbitales genera
Taxa named by Adolpho Ducke